Alberto Espinosa Desigaud was born in Mexico City. He is the current President and CEO of Global Assurance, SA. Alberto was the National President of COPARMEX in 2012. He was named the "Administrator of the Year" by the Federación Nacional de Colegios de Licenciados en
Administración & by the Colegio Nacional de Licenciados en Administración. Alberto was also President of IMEF in 1999 and 2003.
He is currently President of some important Developer, and Partner in " The Edge on Brickell " in Miami, and
130 Sky Boutique Residences, which are across Brickell City Center.
He has more than 30 years in Real State and forms part of Colldwell Banker Luxury Estates in Santa Fe, Mexico.
Alberto has an MBA and a Masters in Financial Management.
With US Preventive Medicine signed an Association to Mexico. 
He is much involved in the Car and Energy Sector, and is a 
member of the board of CCE ( Entrepreneur Largest Association in Mexico ) Coparmex and ICC Mexico.

References 

Brokerage firms
People from Mexico City
1955 births
Living people
Mexican business executives
20th-century Mexican businesspeople
21st-century Mexican businesspeople